Elbasan District was one of the  was one of the 36 districts of Albania, which were dissolved in July 2000 and replaced by 12 counties. It had a population of 224,974 in 2001, and an area of  It was in the centre of the country, and its capital was the city of Elbasan. Its territory is now part of Elbasan County: the municipalities of Elbasan, Belsh and Cërrik.

Administrative divisions
The district consisted of the following municipalities:

Belsh
Bradashesh
Cërrik
Elbasan
Fierzë
Funarë
Gjergjan
Gjinar
Gostimë
Gracen
Grekan
Kajan
Klos
Labinot-Fushë
Labinot-Mal
Mollas
Papër
Rrasë
Shalës
Shirgjan
Shushicë
Tregan
Zavalinë

References

Districts of Albania
Geography of Elbasan County